The Biketawa Declaration is a declaration agreed to by all the leaders of the Pacific Islands Forum constituting a framework for coordinating response to regional crises. The declaration takes its name from the Kiribati islet of Biketawa, where the Forum Leaders met in a retreat to discuss, agree and adopt measures for collective security.

The declaration was agreed to at the 31st Summit of Pacific Islands Forum Leaders, held at Kiribati in October 2000 in the regional context of the 2000 Fijian coup d'état and ethnic tensions in the Solomon Islands. It commits Forum members to eight core values, including good governance, liberty of the individual, democratic processes and indigenous rights. Where these values are breached, the Forum Secretary-General and members will develop a response, which may include mediation, institutional support, or targeted measures (sanctions). Since its adoption it has been invoked a number of times, leading to regional peacekeeping and stabilization operations in:

 Solomon Islands (Regional Assistance Mission to Solomon Islands, 2003 - 2017)
 Nauru (Pacific Regional Assistance to Nauru, 2004-2009)
 Tonga (2006 Nukuʻalofa riots, 2006)
 Nauru (election observation mission for the 2019 Nauruan parliamentary election)

The Declaration also provided the basis for the Forum's 2009 decision to suspend Fiji after it had failed to hold elections in the wake of the 2006 Fijian coup d'état. The suspension was lifted in 2014, after the military regime held elections.

Forum members and NGOs have unsuccessfully sought to invoke the declaration over torture in Fiji, the 2011 Fiji-Tonga territorial dispute, the Nauru government's 2014 crackdown on opposition, and the 2016 Nauruan parliamentary election.

The Declaration was most recently invoked to respond collectively to the COVID-19 pandemic. In July 2021 Forum Secretary-General Henry Puna reminded Samoa's caretaker government of the Declaration in a statement on the 2021 Samoan constitutional crisis.

Biketawa Plus
In 2017 the Forum began to consider expanding the Biketawa Declaration to cover other security threats such as natural disasters. Talks on the proposed "Biketawa plus" continued through 2018, resulting in the 2018 Boe Declaration. This expanded the Bitekawa Declaration to include issues of human security, environmental security, transnational crime, and cybersecurity.

References

External links 
 Biketawa Declaration

Pacific Islands Forum treaties
New Zealand–Pacific relations
Politics of Oceania
2000 in Oceania
2000 in Kiribati
2000 in international relations